Threave may refer to:

 Threave Castle, a castle in Scotland
 Threave Gardens, a garden in Scotland
 Threave Rovers F.C., a football team from Castle Douglas, Scotland